Calicium trabinellum, commonly known as the yellow-collar stubble lichen, is a widespread species of pin lichen in the family Caliciaceae. It was first described by Swedish lichenologist Erik Acharius in 1803 as Calicium xylonellum ß trabinellum. He made the new combination Calicium trabinellum in a later chapter of the same publication.

The thallus of the lichen is usually visible as a stain on the wood upon which it is growing. The underside of the mazaedium is dusted with pruina, which contains the compound vulpinic acid that gives it its yellow colour. The spores of Calicium trabinellum have roughly textured walls and measure 7–10 by 4–6 μm.

The lichen is common on dead wood in boreal and hemiboreal forests. In addition to Europe and North America, Calicium trabinellum has been recorded from Africa and Asia.

References

trabinellum
Lichen species
Taxa named by Erik Acharius
Lichens described in 1803
Lichens of Africa
Lichens of Asia
Lichens of Europe
Lichens of North America